Gascozark is an unincorporated community in western Pulaski County, Missouri, United States. The town site is on Missouri Supplemental Route AB (formerly U.S. Highway 66).

The community's name is a portmanteau of the Gasconade River, west of the location and Ozarks, the surrounding area.

References

Unincorporated communities in Pulaski County, Missouri
Unincorporated communities in Missouri